Nahr-e Mian (also Romanized as Nahr-e Mīān, Nahr Meyān, Nahr Mīān, and Nahrmiyān; also known as Haran) is a village in Nahr-e Mian Rural District, Zalian District, Shazand County, Markazi Province, Iran. At the 2006 census, its population was 1,650, in 424 families.

References 

Populated places in Shazand County